The Declaration of Rights of the Negro Peoples of the World was drafted and adopted at the Convention of the Universal Negro Improvement Association held in New York City's Madison Square Garden on August 13, 1920.  Marcus Garvey presided over the occasion as chairman.  It was at this event where he was duly elected Provisional President of Africa.

Among the articles is Declaration 39 which states as follows:

"That the colors, Red, Black and Green, be the colors of the Negro race."

It is from that statement the Red, Black and Green flag came into existence.

External links

 The UNIA-ACL -- Founded by Marcus Garvey
 American Experience: People & Events: The 1920 Convention of the Universal Negro Improvement Association
 Primary Sources: Declaration of Rights of the Negro Peoples of the World 

1920 documents
1920 in New York City
1920 in politics
African-American history between emancipation and the civil rights movement
United States documents
Universal Negro Improvement Association and African Communities League
African-American history in New York City